John E. EchoHawk (Pawnee, born August 12, 1945) is a Native American attorney and founder of the Native American Rights Fund, established in 1970. He is a leading member of the Native American self-determination movement.

Early life and education
John E. EchoHawk was born on August 12, 1945, into a Pawnee family and is an enrolled member of the tribe.

In 1970 EchoHawk received his J.D. degree, becoming the first Native American to graduate from the University of New Mexico School of Law.  He decided to use his knowledge to benefit Native Americans who do not understand Native American legal and political issues.

Career

EchoHawk is the older brother of Idaho politician Larry EchoHawk, who served as Idaho's State Attorney General 1991-1995, and as director of the Bureau of Indian Affairs in the President Barack Obama administration. John was influential in encouraging Larry to follow him in gaining a J.D. degree.

John EchoHawk served on President Obama's first transition team on Indian affairs. He has been discussed by the Obama administration as a possible nominee to the federal bench. The brothers are cousins of Walter Echo-Hawk, a senior staff attorney at the Native American Rights Fund who contributed to the Native American Graves Protection and Repatriation Act.

Native American Rights Fund 
After law school, EchoHawk joined the staff of California Indian Legal Services. EchoHawk joined other lawyers and tribal members to form the Native American Rights Fund in 1970, which was similar in goals to the National Association for the Advancement of Colored People (NAACP) (both were based on civil rights activism of minority groups). The Native American Rights Fund is a non-profit law firm dedicated to protecting indigenous rights in the U.S. and around the world. EchoHawk centered the Native American Rights Fund's focus around preserving tribes, protecting tribal resources, protecting human rights, ensuring government responsibility, expanding Indian law and educating people about Indian issues.  Through the group, EchoHawk has had a range of civil rights successes, from government recognition of the reach of tribal sovereignty to passage of the Native American Graves Protection and Repatriation Act; the Native American Rights Fund embodies the mission to: preserve tribal existence, protect tribal natural resources, promote human rights, ensure accountability of governments, and, develop Native North American law and educate the public about Native American rights, laws, and issues.

References

1945 births
Living people
20th-century American lawyers
21st-century American lawyers
20th-century Native Americans
21st-century Native Americans
Native American activists
Native American lawyers
Native American leaders
Pawnee people
University of New Mexico alumni